All Saints Church is a church in Lund, Sweden. 
Belonging to the Lunds  All Saints Parish  (Lunds Allhelgonaförsamling) of the Diocese of Lund, it was opened on All Saints' Day 1891. It is situated roughly 600 meters north of Lund Cathedral.

History
It was designed by architect Helgo Zettervall (1831-1907) in gothic revival style. The altar is made of uncut cement. The decorative painting in the church is made by Svante Thulin (1837-1918). The baptismal font is made of polished cement and includes a copper bowl. It is performed by Sven Bengtsson. The altarpiece essay shows a crucifix and was made of wood by Carl Johan Dyfverman (1844-1892). The tower has three bells, cast by M & O Ohlsson bell foundry in Ystad which were inaugurated in 1966.

See also
Lund 1 Runestone

References

Other sources
Wrangel, Ewert (1893) Allhelgonakyrkan i Lund : det gamla och det nya templet skildrade (Lund : Lindstedt)

External links

Allhelgonakyrkan website 

Buildings and structures in Lund
19th-century Church of Sweden church buildings
Tourist attractions in Lund
Churches completed in 1891
Churches in Skåne County
Churches in the Diocese of Lund
1891 establishments in Sweden
Gothic Revival church buildings in Sweden